VOM or Vom may refer to:
 VOM (music), Voices of Music – an early music ensemble
 VOM (punk rock band)
 VOM = Volt-Ohm-Milliammeter, another name for a multimeter 
 Vom, a fictional character in the science fiction novel Bloodhype by Alan Dean Foster
 Veil of Maya, an American deathcore band
 Voice of the Martyrs, a group of Christian organizations devoted to raising awareness of persecutions of Christians around the world
 A Variable-order Markov model
 An abbreviation of vomit
 A German word, the contraction of von dem, meaning "from the", sometimes used in names. See von.